Mankameshwar Temple in Agra is one of the ancient temples devoted to Lord Shiva. The temple is situated at Rawatpara, near Agra Fort Railway Station.

Overview
It is said that the Shiva Linga  in the temple is covered by silver and was founded by Shiva himself in the  Dvapara Yuga, when Krishna was born in Mathura.

The temple has one sanctum sanctorum with a Vigraha of Lord Shiva . It is surrounded by the typical Shiva family idols. One has to descend down a score of stairs to reach the sanctum sanctorum. One can reach fully close to the Vigraha provided one does not wear leather items and English style pants, pyjamas, and salwaar suits.

Behind the sanctum sanctorum are several small temples within the main temple complex. These are devoted to various deities like Goddess Ganga, Saraswati, Gayatri, Hanuman, Kaila devi, Narasimha, Krishna, Rama to name a few.

See also
Agra Fort

References

 Agra.nic.in/tourist.htm
 Travelmadeeasy.in/agra.htm

Tourist attractions in Agra
Hindu temples in Uttar Pradesh
Shiva temples in Uttar Pradesh
Buildings and structures in Agra